Duncan Brian Pauline (born 15 December 1960) is a former Scottish cricketer who played with Surrey.

An all-rounder, Pauline joined Surrey in 1979 having played for Young England the previous year. The only century of his first-class career was made against Sussex in 1983.

He spent 7 years at Surrey before moving to Glamorgan for one final season in the County Championship. Pauline then returned to Scotland and represented them in List A cricket.

External links
Cricket Europe

1960 births
Living people
Cricketers from Aberdeen
Glamorgan cricketers
Scottish cricketers
Surrey cricketers